The name  has been borne by three ships of the Japanese Navy and may refer to:

 Japanese steam warship Musashi, an early steam warship of the Imperial Japanese Navy, formerly USRC Kewanee.

See also
 Musashi (disambiguation)
 List of ships named Musashi

Japanese Navy ship names
Imperial Japanese Navy ship names